Nicolás Enríquez de Vargas (1704-1790) was a novohispanic painter. He was student of Juan Rodríguez Juárez.

Biography 
We only have information of Enríquez from 1722. In 1728 along with José de Ibarra supports the foundation of the Academia de Pintores (Painters Academy) in New Spain, which was the precedent of the Real Academia de San Carlos.  The most of his work remains in Guadalajara.

Works 
 Matanza de los Santos Inocentes, 1737, Museo Soumaya.
 Retrato de Sor Juana Inés de la Cruz, Philadelphia Art Institute.

Gallery

References 

18th-century Mexican painters
18th-century male artists
Mexican male painters
1704 births
1790 deaths